George Morgan (born 7 February 1993) is a British tennis player. He won the Boys' Doubles title at the 2011 Wimbledon Championships alongside Mate Pavić.

Tennis career

Juniors
As a junior Morgan posted a singles win–loss record of 81–41 (74-33 in doubles) and reached a combined ranking of No. 6 in January 2011.

Junior Slam results - Singles:

Australian Open: SF (2011)
French Open: 1R (2011)
Wimbledon: 2R (2011)
US Open: SF (2011)

Junior Slam results - Doubles:

Australian Open: 3R (2011)
French Open: 2R (2011)
Wimbledon: W (2011)
US Open: SF (2011)

Pro tour

Morgan has won one ITF Futures title in singles and five in doubles.

Challengers and Futures finals

Singles: 1 (1 title)

Doubles: 8 (5 titles, 3 runner-ups)

Junior Grand Slam finals

Doubles: 2 (1 title, 1 runner-up)

Retirement
Morgan retired from professional tennis in 2014, playing his final game against Lithuanian Laurynas Grigelis and has since become a tennis coach.

References

External links
 
 

English male tennis players
Sportspeople from Bolton
Wimbledon junior champions
British male tennis players
1993 births
Living people
Tennis people from Greater Manchester
Grand Slam (tennis) champions in boys' doubles